Conklin House may refer to:

Conklin-Montgomery House, Cambridge City, IN, listed on the National Register of Historic Places (NRHP) in Indiana
Nathaniel Conklin House, Babylon, New York, NRHP-listed
Conklin, David Conklin House, Cold Spring Harbor, New York, listed on the NRHP in New York
Conklin Farm, Hounsfield, New York, NRHP-listed
Conklin Mountain House, Olean, New York, NRHP-listed
Conklin House (Chandler, Oklahoma), NRHP-listed